Chen Yi-min, also known as Arthur Chen, is a Taiwanese politician and doctor. He was the vice president of Kaohsiung Medical University. His medical research focuses on cancer, AIDS and epidemiology.

He was the party-list legislator of the Kuomintang in the 9th Legislative Yuan from 2016 to 2020. During the 2019 protest on 2019, he pushed a female police officer and he apologized for that behavior.

In May 2018, he joined the Kuomintang's Kaohsiung mayoral primary campaign. Han Kuo-yu won that campaign and was subsequently nominated as the party's mayoral candidate.

References

1956 births
Living people
Members of the 9th Legislative Yuan
Academic staff of Kaohsiung Medical University
Taiwanese academic administrators
Taiwanese epidemiologists
Kuomintang Members of the Legislative Yuan in Taiwan
Cancer researchers
HIV/AIDS researchers